Coral Wong Pietsch (born November 11, 1947) is an American lawyer who serves as a judge of the United States Court of Appeals for Veterans Claims. She is a former brigadier general in the United States Army Reserve. In 2001 she became the first female general officer in the Army Judge Advocate General’s (JAG) Corps, and the first Asian-American woman to reach general officer rank in the United States Army.

Biography
Born in Waterloo, Iowa, to a Chinese immigrant father from Canton, China who had come to the United States to start a Chinese restaurant, and a Czech American mother, she grew up feeling different from her peers during the height of the Cold War, often being mocked for the Asian half of her ethnicity. Initially earning a bachelor's degree in theatre from the College of Saint Teresa, and later a master's degree in drama from Marquette University, she went on to attend the Catholic University of America for law school, graduating in 1974.  There she would meet her future husband, an army officer who was also attending to become a lawyer.

Commissioned into the Judge Advocate General’s Corps in 1974, she was assigned to Eighth Army in Korea then to Fort Shafter, Hawaii, completing her active duty requirement, and transferring to the Army Reserves. After active duty, she settled down and began to reside in Hawaii with her husband and became a civilian attorney for U.S. Army Pacific.  While a reservist she had been deployed to Johnston Atoll, Japan, the Philippines, Washington D.C., and Iraq.  She was a chair commissioner of the Hawaii Civil Rights Commission, with her term expiring while deployed. In 2001 she became the first female general officer in the Army Judge Advocate General’s (JAG) Corps, and the first Asian-American woman to reach the rank of general in the United States Army.

On November 1, 2011, President Obama nominated her to the United States Court of Appeals for Veterans Claims as his replacement for Judge William P. Greene, who had reached the end of his 15-year term. She was confirmed by the Senate on May 24, 2012.

Recognition
2017 – BG Coral Wong Pietsch was inducted into the U.S. Army Women's Foundation Hall of Fame.

References

1947 births
Living people
United States Army personnel of the Iraq War
American people of Chinese descent
American people of Czech descent
Catholic University of America alumni
Female generals of the United States Army
Judges of the United States Court of Appeals for Veterans Claims
People from Waterloo, Iowa
United States Article I federal judges appointed by Barack Obama
Women in the Iraq War
21st-century American judges
21st-century American women